Cambus railway station served the suburb of Cambus, Clackmannanshire, Scotland from 1852 to 1968 on the Stirling and Dunfermline Railway.

History 
The station opened on 1 July 1852 by the North British Railway. To the south was a goods yard which served Cambus Distillery to the north and was served by a curved siding. Also to the north was Forth Brewery, which was served by a siding from the west. To the west was the signal box. The station closed on 7 October 1968.

References

External links 

Disused railway stations in Clackmannanshire
Railway stations in Great Britain opened in 1852
Railway stations in Great Britain closed in 1968
Beeching closures in Scotland
Former North British Railway stations
1852 establishments in Scotland
1968 disestablishments in Scotland